Gourgouthakas (from "small cutting on rocks, in which rain water is collected and from which animals drink water") is a cave located in the Lefka Ori mountains on the Greek island of Crete.

Gourgouthakas was discovered in 1990 by the Speleological Mission of the Catamaran team, based in Μontbeliard, France. The lake has not yet been explored.

The cave is primarily a deep vertical shaft, filled with intersecting arcades and huge stalagmites and stalactites. Due to its configuration, specialized equipment and expertise is required to explore it.

See also
List of caves in Greece

References

Caves of Greece
Landforms of Crete
Tourist attractions in Crete
Landforms of Chania (regional unit)